They All Fall is a 1925 American comedy film featuring Oliver Hardy. It was preserved by the Academy Film Archive in 2007.

Cast
 Bobby Ray - The assistant janitor
 Oliver Hardy - The boss (as Babe Hardy)

See also
 List of American films of 1925
 Oliver Hardy filmography

References

External links

1925 films
1925 comedy films
American black-and-white films
Films directed by Ralph Ceder
American silent short films
1925 short films
Silent American comedy films
American comedy short films
1920s American films